Lachlan Mackinnon (born 1956) is a contemporary Scottish poet, critic and literary journalist. He was born in Aberdeen and educated at Charterhouse and Christ Church, Oxford. He took early retirement from his job as a teacher of English at Winchester College in 2011 and moved to Ely with his wife, the poet Wendy Cope. 

His output to date includes five collections of poetry, two critical studies and a biography. He also reviews regularly for, among others, The Times Literary Supplement.

Style of poetry
Critics have identified the influence of the American poet Robert Lowell in Mackinnon's first two collections, Monterey Cypress and The Coast of Bohemia, published within three years of one another. His third collection, The Jupiter Collisions, contains, among others, two sequence-poems, and has among its subjects retrospective contemplation of the author's childhood and adolescence, both in personal details and in the context of the 'Sixties (rock music, space travel, Minimalist art). 

One of his most famous papers includes 'prime numbers'. The collection also affords a small number of poems in sonnet form, despite the poet's tendency towards vers-libre, thereby combining the legacy of Lowell with that of W. H. Auden.

In 2010 he published Small Hours with Faber. This includes "The Book of Emma", a long poem addressed to a dead friend and written largely in prose. The volume was short-listed for the Forward Prize in 2010. He also contributed to the Bush Theatre's 2011 project Sixty Six Books for which he wrote a piece based upon a book of the King James Bible
He received a Cholmondeley Award in 2011.

Bibliography
 (1983) Eliot, Auden, Lowell: Aspects of the Baudelairean Inheritance (Macmillan)
 (1988) Monterey Cypress (Chatto & Windus)
 (1988) Shakespeare the Aesthete: An Exploration of Literary Theory (Palgrave)
 (1991) The Coast of Bohemia (Chatto & Windus)
 (1992) The Lives of Elsa Triolet (Chatto & Windus)
 (1998) New Writing 7: An Anthology (Vintage) [in association with the British Council]
 (2003) The Jupiter Collisions (Faber and Faber)
 (2010) Small Hours (Faber and Faber)
 (2011) Sixty Six (short piece) for the Bush Theatre
 (2017) Doves  (Faber and Faber)
 (2022) The Missing Months  (Faber and Faber)

References

External links

1956 births
Living people
People educated at Charterhouse School
Alumni of Christ Church, Oxford
People from Aberdeen
Scottish journalists
Scottish poets
Writers from Aberdeen